Major Nikolay Dmitrevich Dyatlenko  (26 November 1914 – 1996) was a Soviet officer, interrogator and translator who was part of a team that attempted to deliver a message of truce (sometimes referred to as an "ultimatum") to the German Sixth Army at the Battle of Stalingrad in January 1943. He also acted as the translator at the interrogation of Field Marshal Friedrich Paulus a few weeks later.

Life
Dyatlenko was born in 1914 in the village of Kulichka in the Lebedin region, in present-day Sumy Oblast, Ukraine.  He studied philology at the University of Kyiv before World War II, and after the war he became an author.

Stalingrad truce

First attempt
A fluent German speaker, Captain Dyatlenko was transferred to the 7th Department of the Stalingrad Front in the autumn of 1942 to help with the interrogations of German prisoners of war. The historian Antony Beevor claims that he was a member of the NKVD, but there is no mention of this in Dyatlenko's account of the ultimatum delivery, and the index in Erickson's Road to Berlin lists him as a Red Army officer.

Together with Major Aleksandr Mikhailovich Smyslov from Red Army Intelligence, Dyatlenko was chosen by NKVD and Red Army officers to deliver notice of truce to the beleaguered German forces in the Kessel at the Battle of Stalingrad. Smyslov was to be the truce envoy and carried the truce papers in an oilskin packet, whilst Dyatlenko was his interpreter.

Dyatlenko had no idea of the sort of behaviour that was expected of a truce envoy, later admitting that all he knew of the necessary protocols came from Solovyov's play Field Marshal Kutuzov. On 7 January 1943 the two envoys were dressed in the finest uniforms available (the Russian quartermaster assured them that they would be "dressed like bridegrooms") and were driven with Colonel Vinogradov in a Willys jeep  to the edge of 24th Army's sector at Kotluban. All shooting ceased during the night and on 8 January 1943, Dyatlenko and Smyslov, accompanied by a Red Army trumpeter armed with a three-note trumpet and a white flag, approached the German lines. On their first approach they were driven back by German fire.  On a second approach they had no better luck; the fire was not aimed directly at them, but, as on the previous day, was meant to drive them back.

Second attempt
According to one account, the Stavka was keen to call off any further attempts to initiate a truce but on the evening of 8–9 January Soviet planes overflew the Kessel, dropping leaflets signed by Voronov and Rokossovsky addressed to "Deutsche Offiziere, Unteroffiziere und Mannschaften" and printed with an ultimatum to Paulus; they also dropped bombs. German soldiers later admitted that they had picked up these leaflets and read them, so the ultimatum was known about in the defending German army. Dyatlenko and Smyslov were driven to the HQ of the 96th Rifle Division near Marinovka, then a staff car drove them to the front line, from where they proceeded on foot.

On their second attempt, the envoys forgot their white flag, so a new one had to be made from a sheet belonging to the divisional commander; this was nailed to a branch from an acacia. They were again accompanied by a trumpeter, this time a warrant officer named Siderov, whose call "Attention! Attention", although sounding to Dyatlenko more like 'The Last Post'",  had the effect of attracting the attention of a German warrant officer. He asked their business. 

Blindfolded with the shirt from Siderov's snowsuit (as well as forgetting their white flag, the envoys had forgotten to bring the blindfolds they had carried on their attempt the day before) the three Soviets were led behind German lines, at one point slipping on the ice and creating "an unplanned diversion". The German soldiers who came to their aid themselves slipped and fell over, reminding Dyatlenko of the Ukrainian children's game "A little heap is too little: someone is needed on top". Once they had reached the German trenches and had their blindfolds removed, Dyatlenklo realised to his embarrassment that he was carrying his pistol, against international convention. A senior German officer came in, then left to confer with his superiors; he soon returned and told the Soviet envoys to return, without their oilskin packet having had even a cursory inspection.

Erickson wrote of the incident: "Paulus refused to meet the emissaries, who were informed that the Sixth Army's commander already knew the contents of the message from Soviet radio transmission."

Interrogations of captured German officers
After the capitulation of Axis forces at Stalingrad in January–February  1943, Dyatlenko interrogated many senior captured German military officers, including a battalion commander of the German 295th Infantry Division, General Edler von Daniels and Colonel Wilhelm Adam. Adam told him that it was in fact General Schmidt, rather than Paulus, who had ordered the truce envoys away without reading their message (Dyatlenko did not reveal to Adam that he himself had been one of the envoys).

He acted as translator at the interview by General Rokossovsky and Marshal Voronov of Field Marshal Paulus, the commander of the encircled Sixth Army, at Don Front HQ in Zavarykin. As Voronov said to Dyatlenko just before the interrogation, referring to the failed envoy mission:

Following the Paulus interrogation, Dyatlenko was assigned to interrogate a number of other captured German generals, such as the commander of XIV Panzerkorps, General Helmuth Schlömer, and General Walther von Seydlitz-Kurzbach.

Bibliography
Zhilin, V. А. (2002). Сталинградская битва: хроника, факты, люди, Book 2. (contains Dyatlenko's account of the delivery of the ultimatum). Olma Media Group. .

Footnotes

Sources

 
 
 

1914 births
1996 deaths
Soviet military personnel of World War II
Translators from German
Translators from Russian
Ukrainian non-fiction writers
20th-century translators